Renato Tosio (born 16 November 1964 in Wil, Switzerland) is a retired Swiss professional ice hockey goaltender. He is popular for his energetic style of play, for his sportsmanship and also for being a great entertainer and showman.

Playing career
Tosio began his professional career playing for EHC Chur, after playing in junior teams of the club since he was 8 years old. He stayed with Chur until the end of the 1986/87 season, twice winning the NLB championship and thus promoting to the NLA (in 1984 and 1986).

He then played 14 years for SC Bern, the first game on 3 October 1987 against EHC Biel and the final one on 20 March 2001 against HC Lugano.

He was Swiss Ice Hockey Champion for four times with SC Bern: 1989, 1991, 1992, 1997

His jersey number 31 has since been retired. Other retired numbers include 7 (Martin Rauch), 12 (Roland Dellsberger) and 16 (Sven Leuenberger). These numbers are inscribed on a huge banner below the roof of the PostFinance Arena, the home venue of the SC Bern.

Records
 From 23 February 1985 to 20 March 2001 Tosio played 713 NL games in a row, without missing one due to illness or injury.

Career statistics

International play
Renato Tosio played a total of 183 games for the Swiss national team, 145 on the ice and 38 as substitute goaltender.

He participated in the following tournaments:

 5 A World Championships: 1987, 1991, 1992, 1993, 1995
 5 B World Championships: 1986, 1989, 1990, 1994, 1997
 2 Olympic Games: 1988 in Calgary and 1992 in Lillehammer

Tosio wore jersey number 28 in the national team.

Awards
Winner of the Jacques Plante Trophy: 1989, 1990, 1991, 1997

Swiss Hockey Award: 2003

References

External links

1964 births
Living people
ECH Chur players
Ice hockey players at the 1988 Winter Olympics
Ice hockey players at the 1992 Winter Olympics
Olympic ice hockey players of Switzerland
SC Bern players
Swiss ice hockey goaltenders